Brood XIII (also known as Brood 13 or Northern Illinois Brood) is one of 15 separate broods of periodical cicadas that appear regularly throughout the midwestern United States. Every 17 years, Brood XIII tunnels en masse to the surface of the ground, mates, lays eggs, and then dies off in several weeks. 

Although entomologist C. L. Marlatt published an account in 1907 in which he argued for the existence of 30 broods, over the years a number have been consolidated and only 15 are recognized today as being distinct. Brood XIII is among the 12 different broods with 17-year cycles.

Its most recent appearance was in the spring and early summer of 2007, throughout an area roughly enclosed by northern Illinois, eastern Iowa, southern Wisconsin, and a narrow strip of Indiana bordering Lake Michigan and Michigan. It will emerge again in 2024 and 2041.

The 4-centimeter long black bugs do not sting or bite. Once they emerge, they spend their short two-week lives climbing trees, shedding their exoskeletons and reproducing. They can number up to a million per hectare.

The Northern Illinois brood, which will emerge in late May 2024, has a reputation for the largest emergence of cicadas known anywhere.

Ravinia
In the northern Chicago suburb of Highland Park, there was a concern about how the cicadas might drown out the music at the Ravinia Festival during May and June, the peak months of cicada activity.  According to the Chicago Tribune, Ravinia adjusted the schedule so that Chicago Symphony Orchestra (CSO) concerts took place in July, after the outbreak in 2007. Other concerts before this time could have been moved indoors if the noise of the cicadas would have detracted from the music. However, the dates of all concerts, except those for the CSO, took place as scheduled.

2020 Sub-Brood 
Some of the Northern Illinois Sub-Brood (part of Marlatt's XIII) cicadas emerge 4 years early, particularly in the Chicago area in 2020.

Gallery

See also
Magicicada

References

External links
Brood XIII map

Cicadas